Luis Jacob Robin (born 13 August 1912, date of death unknown) was a Peruvian basketball player. He competed in the 1936 Summer Olympics.

References

External links
 

1912 births
Year of death missing
Basketball players at the 1936 Summer Olympics
Olympic basketball players of Peru
Peruvian men's basketball players
Sportspeople from Lima
20th-century Peruvian people